Henry Whitehead may refer to:

J. H. C. Whitehead (1904–1960), British mathematician
Henry Whitehead (bishop) (1853–1947), Bishop of Madras and father of J. H. C. Whitehead
Henry Whitehead (priest) (1825–1896), English minister
Henry Whitehead (MP) (1574–1629), English MP
Henry S. Whitehead (1882–1932), American writer

See also
Harry Whitehead (1874–1944), cricketer
Whitehead (surname)